ARINC 717 defines a digital flight data recorder, with its inputs and outputs. It replaces the older ARINC 573 characteristic, which was based on analog inputs. It allows for more data and real-time recording.

Digital Expandable Flight Data Acquisition and Recording System (DEFDARS) flight recorder output signals include the following: 
 Primary Output – ARINC 717 Harvard biphase encoding
 Auxiliary Output – ARINC 429 (DITS) bi-polar encoding

ARINC 747 defines an alternate solid state recorder that can be used with an ARINC 717 installation.

DEFDARS includes the following component functions
 Digital Flight Acquisition Unit (DFAU)
 Digital Flight Data Recorder (DFDR)
 Accelerometer
 Flight Data Entry Panel (optional) for entry of flight data

History 

 Started in 1979.
 Last revision, -15, June 6, 2011

References 

ARINC standards